Hopton Castle is a civil parish in Shropshire, England.  It contains eleven listed buildings that are recorded in the National Heritage List for England.  Of these, one is listed at Grade I, the highest of the three grades, and the others are at Grade II, the lowest grade.  The parish contains the village of Hopton Castle and the surrounding countryside.  The oldest listed building in the parish consists of the remains of Hopton Castle.  Most of the other listed buildings are houses, cottages, farmhouses and farm buildings, all of which are timber framed.  In addition a church, two memorials in the churchyard, and a telephone kiosk are listed.


Key

Buildings

References

Citations

Sources

Lists of buildings and structures in Shropshire